The Greens (PZ) is a political party in Poland.

It was formed in 2003 under the name "Greens 2004" and formally registered itself in February 2004. It supports principles of green politics, and it is positioned on the centre-left and leans towards the left-wing. The party is an international member of the Global Greens, European member of European Green Party and cooperates with the European Greens–European Free Alliance in the European Parliament.

History 

The party was established in 2003 by activists of several social movements. Among its founding members there were environmentalists, feminists, LGBT people and anti-war activists. The first political campaign of the emerging party concerned the Polish European Union membership referendum, the Greens campaigned for a "yes" vote.

Greens 2004 took part in the movement against the Iraq War in 2003 and participated in Equality Parades and other social protests in the time of "Fourth Republic" (2005–2007). Since 3 March 2013 the official name of the party is Partia Zieloni (The Greens), while Greens 2004 is a historical name and can still be used.

During the late 2000s and the early 2010s the party cooperated with various socialists' parties in the elections.

The party was represented in the Sejm between 2014 and 2015 by Anna Grodzka (she was elected as Polikot's Movement member in 2011). By mid-2010s the party lost many members (e. g. Marcelina Zawisza), who formed new party called Razem (Together).

Since 2018 the party began to cooperate with Civic Platform and Modern parties. In 2019, as part of Civic Coalition, it won 3 seats in Sejm. These representatives became members of Civic Coalition parliamentary group. On 8 March 2023, Klaudia Jachira, previously independent representative within Civic Platform, joined The Greens.

Election results

European Parliament election of 2004 
In the 2004 European Parliament election, the Greens received 0.27% of the votes.

Polish presidential election of 2005 
In the 2005 presidential election, the Greens supported Marek Borowski, the chairman of the SDPL, who received 10.33% of the votes.

Polish local elections of 2006 
In the 2006 local elections, the Greens structured themselves decided on the formula for the start of elections (because the party's national authorities rejected the invitation to the alliance of the Left and Democrats). The independent list of the Greens in Warsaw received 11 210 votes (1.68%) and 7th place out of 14. Less than 1% of support was obtained in Wrocław and Gdańsk by the local committees co-created by the Greens with Young Socialists. In other cities, people associated with the party were candidates from local, mainly non-party lists or the Left and Democrats coalition.

Polish parliamentary election of 2007 
In the 2007 parliamentary election, the Greens contested one district in the Senate.

European Parliament election of 2009 
In February 2009, the Greens formed a coalition called Alliance for the Future (Porozumienie dla Przyszłości - CentroLewica) with the social liberal Democratic Party and the social democratic SDPL, forming a common list for the 2009 European Parliament election.

Polish presidential election of 2010 
In the 2010 presidential election, the Greens supported Grzegorz Napieralski based on the analysis of the programs of the most important candidates. The SLD candidate obtained the highest score in the Green Index ranking: 78 on a scale from -200 to +200 points. In the second round, the party members encouraged to vote, but they did not support any of the candidates, pointing to their conservatism and economic neoliberalism.

Polish local elections of 2010 
In the 2010 local elections, members of the Greens ran in most cases from the lists of Democratic Left Alliance. In these elections, the Greens won five seats in local councils and regional parliaments.

Polish parliamentary election of 2011 
In the 2011 parliamentary election, representatives of the party again found themselves on the lists of the Democratic Left Alliance, but they did not obtain any seats in the Sejm. The Green candidates themselves gained 23 421 votes, which gave 0.16% of the votes. The only one of the Greens was their chairman Dariusz Szwed opening the list in the Chrzanów constituency, in which he obtained 3 842 votes.

European Parliament election of 2014 
In the 2014 European Parliament election, the Greens formed their own Election Committee of the Greens. The representatives of the Women's Party, the Polish Socialist Party and Young Socialists have announced the start of the Green Committee's lists. The Committee registered lists in five districts. The Committee of the Greens obtained 22 221 votes (0.32%) in the elections, taking the 10th place (ahead of, among others, the Direct Democracy committee, whose lists were registered in six districts).

Polish local elections of 2014 
In the 2014 local elections, the Greens issued their own letters to the city council in Warsaw and Wrocław, in Warsaw, issuing Joanna Erbel as their own candidate for the city's presidency, and in Wrocław supporting the SLD candidate. In Kraków, together with trade unions and city movements, they co-founded the Kraków Against the Olympic Committee. In Opole, the current councilor of the Greens, Beata Kubica (elected in 2010 from the SLD list) ran for the city council from the list of German Minorities. In the Lubuskie voivodeship, the Greens together with the Social Justice Movement, trade unions and civic movements, co-founded the Nowy Ład Committee in the elections to the regional council. The Greens also issued a dozen or so candidates in the One-National Electoral Circumscriptions in Poland.

As a result of the elections, the independent lists of the Green Party in Warsaw received 2.55% of votes to the city council. A similar result (2.48%) was received by the candidate for the mayor of the city, Joanna Erbel. The Wrocław Green list received 1.97% of the votes to the city council. In Kraków, the Kraków Against the Olympic Committee, co-created by the Greens, received 6.7% of the votes, which did not translate into mandates, with Tomasz Leśniak receiving 4.84% of the votes in the elections for the city president. The Electoral Committee New Deal, co-created by the Greens, received 0.62% of support in the elections to the Lubusz Regional Assembly (it was the 10th result from among 11 committees). No Green candidate for a councilor in the single-member district has obtained a seat.

Polish presidential election of 2015 
In the 2015 presidential election, the candidate for the party was the deputy Anna Grodzka, who, however, did not collect the required number of 100 000 signatures.

Polish parliamentary election of 2015 
Greens joined the Zjednoczona Lewica (United Left) electoral alliance for the 2015 parliamentary election in July 2015. In the election the alliance received 7.6% of the vote, below the 8% electoral threshold leaving the alliance with no parliamentary representation. It was officially dissolved in February 2016.

Polish local elections of 2018 
In the 2018 local elections, the Greens, without any electoral alliance, managed to obtain the highest ever result in their party history of 1.15% of the votes, with their highest result as a percentage in Lubusz voivodeship (2.62%), and the highest local Gmina result being in Gmina Żary (10.0%).

This concludes that the Greens achieved better overall results in Western Poland areas which are near to the borders of Germany.

Sejm and European Parliament elections of 2019 
On 6 November 2018, at a press conference, the Greens officially announced preparations for the 2019 elections both at the national and European level. Announced at the end of July 2019, the party will participate in the 2019 Polish parliamentary election as part of the Civic Coalition.

Principles and policies 
The framework for Green policies, called The Green Manifesto, was adopted by the founding congress of the party on 6 and 7 September 2003. The Green Manifesto outlined the principles of green politics in seven areas: social justice and solidarity, civil society and reclaiming the state for citizens, environmental protection and sustainable development, gender equality, respect for national, cultural and religious diversity, protecting minority rights, and non-violent conflict resolution.

At the 4th Congress in April 2011, the Greens 2004 adopted elaborated policy documents concerning the principles of social policy, education policy, and health care policy.

Current policies 
The current official policies approved during the party's XI Congress:

"Protection of Earth resources is our obligation"

 The total departure from obtaining energy from oil, coal and other fossil fuels and obtaining it in at least 50% from renewable energy sources by 2030.
 Resignation from plans for the construction of nuclear power plants.
 Supporting efforts to reduce global greenhouse gas emissions by at least 40% by 2030 compared to 1990 levels.
 Increase energy efficiency by 45% by 2050 to combat air pollution, energy poverty and combating climate change.
 Completion of production and sale of new combustion vehicles by 2030 and replacement with non-standard vehicles.
 Establishment of a national program for the construction and reconstruction of railway connections for 2020–2030.
 Protection of current and gradual increase of existing valuable natural areas, e.g. Białowieża Forest.
 Protection of water resources and their rational use through proper retention and saving.
 Prohibition of animal husbandry for fur and circuses with animals.

"Good governance economy"

 Introduction of an economy model based on such values as human rights, solidarity, the rule of law, ecological responsibility and democracy.
 Circular economy (secondary use of raw materials) and promotion of conscious consumer choices.
 Guarantee of places in nurseries and kindergartens, enabling parents to return to the labor market.
 Begin the process of gradually shortening the work week to 30 hours per week.
 The gradual introduction of basic guaranteed income.
 Opposition to the construction of the German-Russian Nord Stream 2 gas pipeline.
 Equal pay for men and women.
 Limiting wage redistribution in Europe and guaranteeing a minimum European pension.
 Prohibition of advertisements directed to children and promoting parapharmaceutical products.

"Equality and solidarity being everyone's right"

 Fighting against racial, religious and ideological discrimination as well as the reasons for the escape of people from their countries.
 Prohibition of arms exports to conflict regions.
 The right to breathe clean air.
 Active help for people suffering from exclusion from traffic and random events.
 Dissemination of nursing, dental and psychological care in nurseries, kindergartens and schools.
 Support for seniors raising children and carers of people with disabilities.
 Introduction of parish properties by same-sex couples.
 Equal retirement age for women and men at the age of 65 with the possibility of retirement earlier by 5 years.
 Lowering the active electoral law to the age of 16 in local elections.
 Legal admissibility of euthanasia for terminally ill people, who will express their will to end their lives.

"Good quality food based on sustainable development"

 Moving away from industrial animal husbandry, moving to agriculture without chemical poisons by 2040 and not allowing GMO.
 Support for organic farming as well as local and direct sale of agricultural products.
 Protection of the durability of family farms and protection of social rights of farmers and farmers as well as employees and employees in the farm.
 Education and raising public awareness of issues related to food consumption and its impact on human health - especially diseases such as obesity, diabetes, allergies.
 A more just system of subsidies for all agriculture and increased subsidies for sustainable and local agriculture.

Policies formulated in previous years 
In the past, the Greens in their manifestos have declared, among others:

 sustainable economic, social and ecological development;
 energy model based on energy efficiency and prosumer renewable energy;
 social justice and the elimination of inequality;
 maintaining the separation of churches and religious associations from the state;
 the right of women to legal abortion;
 introduction of registered partnerships (available for both homosexual and heterosexual persons);
 drug policy based on education and prevention, not punishment;
 maintaining state education and health care;
 withdrawal of Polish troops from Afghanistan;
 urban policy based on public services, active housing policy, development of accessible public transport, support for universal and accessible education, health and culture, respect for greenery and ecosystems;
 sustainable development of rural areas, support for organic farming, total elimination of GMOs.

The Greens, due to their pacifist stance, also oppose the restoration of the death penalty and the introduction of a flat tax, as well as the construction of elements of US anti-missile installations in Poland (the so-called anti-missile shield).

Cooperating entities 
Organizations which are affiliated or managed with and by the Greens.

 The "Green Area" Foundation; promotes sustainable, sustainable economic, social and ecological development. It supports financially and substantively activities in line with the ideology and program of the Greens, as well as political parties and non-governmental organizations.
 Association "Acute Green"; involved in the promotion of human rights, sustainable development, democracy, environmental protection. It is the party's youth wing and it focuses on mainly young pro-environmental activists.
 The journal "Green News"; discusses issues related to ecology, sustainable development, democracy, human rights, minority rights, presenting alternatives to the dominant socio-economic system.

Party leaders and personalities

Leaders 
Female co-chair
 2003–2008 Magdalena Mosiewicz
 2008–2010 Agnieszka Grzybek
 2010–2011 Małgorzata Tkacz-Janik
 2011–2015 Agnieszka Grzybek
 2015– Małgorzata Tracz

Male co-chair
 2003–2004 Jacek Bożek
 2004–2011 Dariusz Szwed
 2011–2013 Radosław Gawlik
 2013–2016 Adam Ostolski
 2016–2020 Marek Kossakowski
 2020– Wojciech Kubalewski

Party Executive Council 

 Wojciech Kubalewski – Leader (male)
 Małgorzata Tracz – Leader (female)
 Magdalena Gałkiewicz – General Secretary
 Mariusz Rusinek – Treasurer
 Krzysztof Rzyman – Spokesperson
 Joanna Brauła – Member
 Arkadiusz Gmurczyk – Member
 Ula Zielińska – Member

Former Members of the Sejm 
 2014–2015 Anna Grodzka

Councillors and members of regional parliaments 
 Małgorzata Tkacz-Janik, member of the regional parliament of Silesia
 Ewa Koś, member of the regional parliament of West Pomerania
 Krystian Legierski, councillor in Warsaw
 Beata Kubica, councillor in Opole
 Sebastian Kotlarz, councillor in Kąty Wrocławskie

Notable members 
Other notable members of the party include: Kinga Dunin (writer, feminist, editor of Krytyka Polityczna), Radosław Gawlik (environmental activist, former deputy minister of the environment), Zbigniew Marek Hass, Tomasz Kitliński (philosopher, LGBT rights activist), Wojciech Koronkiewicz (poet, journalist, film director), Izabela Kowalczyk (art critic), Bartłomiej Kozek, Aleksandra Kretkowska, Bartosz Lech (former co-chair of the FYEG), Paweł Leszkowicz (art curator and art historian), Jerzy Masłowski, Magdalena Masny, Adam Ostolski (sociologist, member of Krytyka Polityczna), Monika Paca, Kazimiera Szczuka (writer, feminist, hosted the Polish version of The Weakest Link), Olga Tokarczuk (writer), Ludwik Tomiałojć (ornithologist), Ewa Sufin-Jacquemart (Consul of Poland in Luxembourg 2007–2011).

Other persons who used to be or still are affiliated with the Green party 

 Anna Baumgart
 Jacek Bożek
 Alina Cała
 Ewa Charkiewicz
 Piotr Czerniawski
 Kinga Dunin
 Joanna Erbel
 Agnieszka Grzybek
 Tomasz Kitliński
 Jerzy Kochan
 Yga Kostrzewa
 Izabela Kowalczyk
 Krystian Legierski
 Robert Leszczyński
 Paweł Leszkowicz
 Jerzy Masłowski
 Magdalena Mosiewicz
 Witold Mrozek
 Adam Ostolski
 Monika Paca
 Dariusz Szwed
 Tomasz Szypuła
 Kazimierz Ślęczka
 Magdalena Środa
 Małgorzata Tarasiewicz
 Olga Tokarczuk
 Małgorzata Tkacz
 Marcelina Zawisza

Party Congresses

Founding Congress, 6–7 September 2003, Warsaw 

 Congress accepted the "Green Manifesto", which is the basic policy document of the party.

1st Congress, 12–14 November 2004, Gdańsk

II Congress, 24–26 February 2006, Katowice

III Congress, 1–2 March 2008, Warsaw 

 Congress accepted the amendments to the statute, replacing the terms "co-chairman" (male) and "co-chairman" (female) with their shorter versions. The Greens also adopted several positions on foreign policy, including on the withdrawal of troops from Iraq and Afghanistan and opposition to the anti-missile shields.

IV Congress, 16–18 April 2010, Warsaw 

 Congress adopted four program resolutions: on electoral law, social policy priorities, health policy and education policy.

V Congress (program), 2–3 September 2011, Warsaw 

 Congress adopted five program resolutions concerning: green economy, protection of employees' rights, energy and climate policy, secular state and cultural policy.

VI Congress, 2–4 December 2011, Warsaw 

 Congress chose the new party authorities.

VII Congress, 2–3 March 2013, Warsaw 

 Congress chose the new party authorities, and adopted two program resolutions regarding European policy and policies to support renewable energy sources. The name of the party from "Zieloni 2004" (Greens 2004) to "Partia Zieloni" (Green Party) was also changed.

VIII Congress, 12–13 July 2014, Warsaw 

 Congress again chose Agnieszka Grzybek and Adam Ostolski as party chairmen, and also adopted resolutions regarding local government elections, presidential and parliamentary elections.

IX Congress, 30–31 May 2015, Warsaw 

 Congress discussed program matters, and elected new party authorities.

X Congress, 20–21 February 2016, Warsaw 

 Congress chose the new party authorities and accepted Green Manifesto 2.0.

XI Congress (program), 30 September – 1 October 2017, Warsaw 

 Congress accepted the Green Message program.

XII Congress, 17–18 February 2018, Warsaw 

 Congress chose the party's authorities and decided to make an independent start in elections to regional assemblies in local elections in 2018, and also adopted a resolution on the need to establish a broad coalition in the elections to the European Parliament of 2019.

See also 
The Greens (Poland) politicians
LGBT rights in Poland

References

See also 

 List of political parties in Poland

External links
Official website of The Greens (in Polish)
Polish Shades of Green, ed. by Przemysław Sadura, Heinrich Böll Foundation, Warsaw 2009
Green Voice from Poland

Sources for expansion of the article might be: homepage of the party, in Polish and European Green Party's Zieloni sub-site.

2004 establishments in Poland
Civic Coalition (Poland)
European Green Party
Feminist parties in Europe
Global Greens member parties
Green parties in Europe
Political parties established in 2004
Political parties in Poland
Pro-European political parties in Poland
Progressive parties
Social democratic parties in Poland